Christopher Eric Wilfred Silverwood (born 5 March 1975) is a former international cricketer and a former head coach of the England cricket team. He is currently the Head Coach of the Sri Lanka Cricket Team.

Early life and domestic playing career 
Born in Pontefract, West Yorkshire, Silverwood was educated at Garforth Comprehensive School, and as a right-arm fast bowler, made his debut for Yorkshire County Cricket Club in 1993. He played for his native county for thirteen years, and was one of a battery of fast bowlers which the county produced in the late 1990s. With the club he won the County Championship in 2001 and the C&G (Friends Provident Trophy) in 2002. Former England bowling coach Bob Cottam once said he was faster than Allan Donald, and he possessed a lively outswinger and hostile bouncer when the conditions suited. He was also known for his stamina, and was noted for his ability to maintain his pace when returning for spells late in the day.

He signed for Middlesex for the 2006 season after playing only six games for Yorkshire in the 2005 season, having left by mutual consent after sustaining a series of injuries. He had a good first season with Middlesex, taking 63 first-class wickets, but struggled with injuries thereafter, leaving the club in 2009.

In 2009 he signed a contract with Harare-based franchise Mashonaland Eagles as player-coach, making his debut against Matabeleland Tuskers.

By the end of his career, the six-foot one inch paceman had taken 577 first-class wickets in 184 matches at an average of 27.41, with a best of 7 for 93 and 259 List A one day wickets at 25.05 with a best of 5 for 28. Usually a tail-end batsman he was occasionally used as a pinch hitter in one day games.

Silverwood won the NBC Denis Compton Award in 1996.

Internationals
Silverwood was selected for the England tours of Zimbabwe and New Zealand in 1996–97. He made his international debut in the first One Day International (ODI) against Zimbabwe on 15 December, with Zimbabwe winning by two wickets. Silverwood followed this with his Test debut in the first Test, a match which England drew with the scores level at the end of the match. He took four wickets, but was not selected for the second Test, though he did play in the remaining ODIs against Zimbabwe as well as the final two ODIs of the New Zealand leg of the trip. In May 1997, Silverwood made his only home international appearance when he played the third ODI against Australia.

His next international appearances did not come until 1999, when he played four Tests of the 1999–2000 tour of South Africa. Silverwood struggled, with the ball not moving, taking  7 wickets at an average of just below 50.

He made a final Test appearance in the 2002–03 Ashes series in Australia, finishing his international career with a total of six Tests and seven ODIs.

Coaching career

Essex
In 2010, Silverwood joined Essex as bowling coach, and was promoted to the head coach position ahead of the 2016 season. His first year in the role saw Essex promoted to the First Division of the County Championship, followed by them winning the competition in 2017.

England

Silverwood joined the England coaching team as full-time fast bowling coach in January 2018. He was announced as the new head coach on 7 October 2019, following the departure of Trevor Bayliss at the end of the 2019 season. He was appointed head of selectors in April 2021, which combined both his roles. In the 2021–22 Ashes series Silverwood was criticised for poor decisions - most notably batting first and omitting both James Anderson and Stuart Broad in the First Test, and not selecting Jack Leach in the Second Test. It was announced on 3 February 2022, that he would be leaving the role, following a 4:0 Ashes campaign.

Sri Lanka 
In April 2022, he was appointed as head coach for Sri Lanka national cricket team for 2 years.

References

External links 
 

1975 births
Living people
England Test cricketers
English cricketers
Mashonaland cricketers
Middlesex cricketers
Yorkshire cricketers
England One Day International cricketers
Cricketers from Pontefract
People from Garforth
NBC Denis Compton Award recipients
Marylebone Cricket Club cricketers
English cricketers of 1969 to 2000
English cricketers of the 21st century
People educated at Garforth Academy